This is a list of Nigerian films released in 2011.

Films

See also
List of Nigerian films

References

External links
2011 films at the Internet Movie Database

2011
Lists of 2011 films by country or language
Films